Drew Alan Mitchell (born 26 March 1984) is a former Australian rugby union professional player. He played on the wing or as fullback. Up to the 2006 season he played for the Queensland Reds. He played for the Western Force for the 2007–09 Super 14 seasons. From 2010 to 2013 he played for the New South Wales Waratahs. Since 2013 he has played for RC Toulon. He made his debut for Australia in 2005 and is Australia's highest try scorer in World Cup history.

Early life
Mitchell was educated at Strathpine West State School and St Patrick's College, Shorncliffe and played his junior rugby for the Pine Rivers Pumas Rugby Union club, going on to play rugby for University of Queensland Rugby Club. Mitchell went on to captain the Queensland Academy of Sport U-19 team as well as going on to be an Australian Schoolboy and Sevens international.

Career

Mitchell made his international debut for the Wallabies against South Africa in 2005, after being selected after a season with the Queensland Reds in which he scored 11 tries and was named Australia's rookie of the year.

Mitchell's international career stalled after Australia's autumn international tour in 2005, and he didn't feature for the Wallabies again until Wales visited in 2007. By this time Mitchell had switched to newly formed Western Force and impressed enough to gain a place in the Australia squad for the 2007 World Cup in France. He scored seven tries during that tournament.

Mitchell's domestic future again had a period of speculation when he was approached by the NSW Waratahs and the ACT Brumbies ahead of the 2010 Super Rugby season. Mitchell eventually signed for the NSW Waratahs, replacing Sam Norton-Knight.

Mitchell dislocated his ankle and broke a bone in his leg after he collided with Scott Higginbotham of the Reds during their match on Saturday, 23 April and was initially ruled out of the 2011 Rugby World Cup. However, he subsequently made a full recovery and was included in Australia's tournament squad. He made one substitute appearance against Ireland and in two starts scored one try against the USA and two against Russia. He injured his hamstring in the final pool stage match of the 2011 World Cup, missing the remainder of the tournament. In the lead up to the 2012 Super Rugby season Mitchell suffered an ankle problem, and missed the Waratahs pre-season games. He did not play any games in the first half of the competition, making only five appearances all season.

In 2013, Mitchell agreed a two-year deal to play for Toulon for the 2012–13 Top 14 season. Mitchell went on to make 81 appearances for the Toulon side, securing several European & French crowns, his final match being a Top 14 Final loss to Clermont.

Mitchell's international career turned to a standstill after he left the Super Rugby back in 2013, but with the Australian Rugby change of rules to the eligibility of overseas based Australian Rugby players under Giteau's law, Mitchell and Toulon teammate Matt Giteau were included in the Wallabies' squad for the 2015 Rugby Championship. With solid performances playing against the Springboks in the 24–20 win at Suncorp Stadium, and the 27–19 win against New Zealand at ANZ Stadium, Mitchell was included in the Wallabies' 31-man squad for the 2015 Rugby World Cup.

Mitchell's last match playing for the Wallabies was in the 2016 Rugby Championship victory against the Springboks, coming off the bench after a groin injury.

On 17 April 2017, Mitchell announced the end of his rugby career on Twitter in spite of previous reports of a possible return to the Super Rugby. 

In February 2022, Mitchell participated in a charity match at Suncorp Stadium to raise funds for Tonga after a tsunami devastated the island nation. After taking a number of heavy tackles from the Tongan side, Mitchell jokingly remarked that he "donated a hamstring and a rib to the Tongan relief fund", and also stressed that there was "no chance" of a comeback to the sport.

Mitchell is now a rugby commentator for Stan Sport.

References

External links
 
Profile on ESPN Scrum
Waratahs profile
Wallabies profile

1984 births
Australian rugby union players
Australia international rugby union players
Queensland Reds players
Western Force players
New South Wales Waratahs players
RC Toulonnais players
Living people
Rugby union players from Brisbane
Rugby union wings
Rugby union fullbacks